Thomas Winston Simons Jr. (born September 4, 1938) is an American diplomat and academic. He served as ambassador to Poland from 1990 to 1993, and ambassador to Pakistan from 1996 to 1998.

Born in Crosby, Minnesota, Simons is of German, English and Scots-Irish descent. He attended Karachi Grammar School and Sidwell Friends School and is a graduate of Yale and Harvard. Simons escorted Duke Ellington during his tour of the Middle East and Pakistan.

In 1969, he worked as a deputy to the U.S. Ambassador to Poland, Walter Stoessel, and assisted in making connections which eventually resulted in President Richard M. Nixon's historic visit to China.

He taught at Stanford University upon his retirement from the United States Foreign Service, and holds visiting appointments at Harvard and Cornell. Prior to joining the Foreign Service, Simons was an adjunct professor at Brown University.

References

External links

1938 births
Living people
People from Crosby, Minnesota
Ambassadors of the United States to Poland
Ambassadors of the United States to Pakistan
Yale University alumni
Harvard University alumni
Stanford University faculty
Brown University faculty
American people of Scotch-Irish descent
American people of English descent
American people of German descent
Karachi Grammar School alumni
United States Foreign Service personnel